Banu Chichek or Bağnu Chichek is a character in the Book of Dede Korkut and other Turkic mythology. Just like Bamsi Beyrek, Chichek's character has also been adapted in the Turkish TV series, Diriliş: Ertuğrul, portrayed by Ezgi Esma Kürklü.

In the Book of Dede Korkut

Etymology and personality 
The word Banu/Bani, is of Persian origin meaning "lady" and "wife of the king", therefore it can be thought as a title before the name Chichek. The name "Chichek" means "flower, blossom" which came from Proto-Turkic "čeček", it has a deep-rooted history indicating beauty and it is used as a female name until this day.

The character Banu Chichek is depicted as a strong woman.  In the story, Bamsi Beyrek's father Bay Pure asks his son, "What girl among the Oghuz do you want to marry?". Beyrek answers "Father, find me a girl who will rise before I get to my feet, who will be on horseback before I mount my well-trained horse, who before I reach my enemy will bring me their heads; that's the sort of girl to find for me, father." Then his father replies "You seem to want a comrade, a fellow warrior." Adrienne Mayor writes, "In other words, "the kind of woman I want" is "not a wife but a companion."" and "That girl would be Banu Chichak, a Kipchak princess renowned as a skilled "rider, hunter, archer and wrestler.""

Storyline

Birth 
Legend II ( or Bamsi Beyrek of the Grey Horse according to translator Geoffrey Lewis) is centered around Bamsi Beyrek. In the legend, it says that once the Oghuz princes all gathered up somewhere. The father of Beyrek, Bay Büre, wept when he saw everyone had a son besides him. The princes asked why he was crying, he replied that it was because he doesn't have a son to carry on his family. The princes all started to pray that Bay Büre would get a son.  also prayed that he would get a daughter that he would marry to Bay Büre's son. And they sooner or later got the children they wanted.

Bamsi Beyrek meets Banu Chichek 
Banu Chichek, daughter of Bay Bichen first meets Bamsi Beyrek, her destined husband, when Bamsi went hunting. On the hunt, Beyrek finds a red tent in which Lady Chichek was residing. However, at the time Beyrek doesn't know to whom that tent belongs and a woman, Kisirja Yinge, comes out from the tent and asks him for some of the deer he hunted. Bamsi gives all the deer to her. When maids bring the deer inside, Lady Chichek asks about the young man who hunted the deer and her maids describe him just the way his father described the man she will be destined to marry. 

After this, she tells her maids to call Beyrek inside. Banu Chichek hides her true identity and introduces herself as "serving-woman of Lady Chichek.", then she continues "Come, let us ride out together. We shall shoot our bows and race our horses and wrestle. If you beat me in these three you will beat her too." By this, it is implied that only if he can beat her in these three, he would be worthy of Banu Chichek and only then he can marry her. Beyrek's horse passes Banu Chichek's and his arrow splits the girl's arrow but when it comes to wrestling, Beyrek was astonished by her strength, he thinks "If I am beaten by this girl they will pour scorn on my head and shame on my face among the teeming Oghuz." He then "grapples with the girl" and "seizes her breast", when she struggles to free herself in surprise, he had to make a "supreme effort" to "seize her slender waist, held her tight and threw her on her back." After the wrestling, Banu Chichek reveals her name and "Three times he (Beyrek) kisses her and once he bites her." Then, he gives her a ring saying "Let this be the sign of our engagement." 

But Lady Chichek has a devious brother called Crazy Karchar, who would kill anyone wishing to marry his sister. With the help of Dede Korkut, Beyrek outwits Karchar and his wedding with Chichek was soon about to happen. However, due to a traitor from the infidels, Beyrek is captured by the ruler of Bayburt Castle.

Yaltajuk, the son of Yalanji
Sixteen years passed, and Delu Karchar said to the great Bayindir Khan; "Your Majesty — may Allah give you long life —, if Beyrek had been alive all these sixteen years, he would have reappeared by now. If anyone brings me news that he is alive, I shall give that person a bag of gold. If anyone brings me news that he is dead, I shall give him my sister." This leads to the devious Yaltajuk, the son of Yalanji, asking the Khan if he could go and search for him. It happened that Beyrek had once presented this man with a shirt, which he did not wear, but put away and kept. Yaltajuk dipped this shirt in blood and brought it to Bayindir Khan and dropped it on the ground before him claiming he was dead. The shirt was sent to Chichek, who recognised it, and thus everyone believed Yaltajuk and there was great mourning for several days. Bay Bure secretly asked a group of merchants if they knew what had happened to Beyrek. The merchants replied in a song; 

Meanwhile, Beyrek met the daughter of the prince of the infidels, who loved him. She became the reason for him escaping. When Beyrek saw that people were getting ready for a wedding, he asked a shepherd about what was going on. The shepherd, who didn't know he was the son of Bay Bure, said that Banu Chichek was about to marry Yaltajuk because Bay Bure's son Bamsi had died. Bamsi then attacked Yaltajuk at the wedding. Yaltajuk didn't know that it was Bamsi and he attempted to kill him. But it was too late and after some events, Yaltajuk's treachery was revealed. In the end, Yaltajuk begs for forgiveness and Chichek marries Bamsi.

Notes

TV adaptation

This section documents her adaptation into the Turkish TV series, Diriliş: Ertuğrul. In the series, her name is spelt in Turkish as "Banu Çiçek". All information related to her husband Doğan is also documented here. However, the character in the series is not related to "Banu Chichek" in the "Book of Dede Korkut", scriptwriters simply took the character's name from the book.

Storyline

Season 1–2

After being mentioned in the first season by Bamsı Beyrek as Doğan's love interest, Banu Çiçek is shown in the second season as a childhood friend of Selcan Hatun. Selcan attempts to ask for some help from her against the devious Aytolun Hatun, although she refuses to listen. Meanwhile, a dejected Doğan Alp, Ertuğrul Bey's somewhat diminutive adoptive brother and alp, who had previously been mistreated and ignored by the Alpbaşıs (Chief Alps) Tuğtekin Bey and Gündoğdu Bey, falls in love with her, and Çiçek soon does too, but continues to be loyal to Aytolun as she was her Hanım. After Aytolun kills her husband and Çiçek's adoptive father Korkut, much to Çiçek's devastation, the blame is put on Çiçek by Aytolun and her brother Gümüştekin Bey, as she had agreed to ally with Selcan and Halime to investigate her adoptive mother Duru Hatun's death. After Doğan helps Çiçek escape, she and Selcan plan to show the reality of Aytolun, her brother Gümüştekin, and her niece Goncagül Hatun to Çiçek's adoptive brother and Aytolun's step-son Tuğtekin, later proving to Tuğtekin that Aytolun had poisoned both his parents, Korkut Bey and Duru Hatun. After the plan is successful, Aytolun and Goncagül are killed, Doğan marries Çiçek and the Kayı, along with Çiçek, move to Bithynia.

Season 3

In season 3, Çiçek, who is now the bodyguard of the Kayı Hanım, Halime Hatun, is shown to be annoyed at Ertuğrul Bey and Halime Hatun due to the tribe's poverty and the fact that she had not seen her husband for years, suspecting that Ertuğrul had been hiding Doğan's death. Doğan had actually been working as a spy in Karacahisar Castle, and later returned to help his adoptive brothers Ertuğrul Bey, Bamsı Beyrek and Turgut Alp fight against the Templar Hancı Simon, and conquering the Hanlı Pazar from the Templars for the Kayı tribe. Following Doğan's arrival, a very happy Çiçek announces that she is pregnant. However, after the devious Günyelı Hatun tricks Dündar Bey, Ertuğrul's brother and Doğan's adoptive brother, into revealing information, Doğan is ambushed by Ural Bey and Tekfur Vasilius and is killed. The devastated Banu Çiçek gives birth to Doğan's posthumous son, whom Ertuğrul names 'Doğan' after his late father. She also demonstrates frustration with Dündar after her husband's death. Doğan is eventually avenged after Ertuğrul kills Ural and Vasilius, whilst Çiçek eventually forgives Dündar.

Appearance and other information
She and her son are not shown or mentioned after season 3 or in the sequel series Kuruluş: Osman. However, her husband Doğan is mentioned by Ertuğrul in his final moments in Kuruluş: Osman, when he remembers his loved ones. It is unknown if Doğan Jr will yet appear in the series, as has been rumoured.

In Diriliş: Ertuğrul, Bamsi Beyrek also made an appearance, although he married a woman named Hafsa Hatun. In the same way, another character from the Book of Dede Korkut, Selcan Hatun, also made an appearance in the series. Selcan later appeared again in the sequel to the show, Kuruluş: Osman, with Bamsı.

Reception
The series is extremely popular in Pakistan. Ezgi Esma, who plays Banu's role said, “I’ve been receiving hundreds of messages full of love, kindness and nice words from you." She also expressed her wish to visit the country and have "chai", meaning "tea" in English translated from Urdu, which is what Pakistan is known for.

The actor who portrays the role of Doğan, Cavit Çetin Güner, said "Main Jald Pakistan Aonga", meaning "I will soon arrive in Pakistan" in English, before also saying later "I apologise from  the Pakistanis. In Turkey, I met a man named Musawir Abbasi who was a lawyer and we talked and agreed on a business plan. However, later I found out that the business plan was fake and Musawir Abbasi lied to me. We have a mutual love for Pakistani people but due to current circumstances, I won’t be able to visit Pakistan. I believe that I will meet trustworthy people and will meet you soon." He was noted for following Pakistani actress Sadia Khan, and she also following him back. Pakistani cricketer Mohammad Amir also said that the actor has a resemblance to Indian cricketer Virat Kohli. Upon his arrival in Islamabad later that year, he was given a special portrait by an 11-year-old Pakistani fan. After enjoying a horseback ride in the country, he thanked Pakistani actress Nimra Khan for giving him a warm welcome. On the other hand, Pakistani actress Armeena Khan was criticised for not greatly welcoming the actor to Pakistan while saying that she'll like to meet Esra Bilgiç, who plays the role of Halime Hatun in the series.

See also
List of Diriliş: Ertuğrul characters
List of Kuruluş: Osman characters

References

This article incorporates information from Turkish Wikipedia.

Fictional Turkish people
Fictional Turkic people
Characters in the Book of Dede Korkut